Michel Villedo (1598–1667) was a French stonemason from Creuse, who became advisor and architect of royal buildings for Louis XIV of France.

Biography 
Villedo was  born in 1598 in Pionnat, in the Creuse department in the Limousin area in central France. He began his career as a stonemason in the reign of Henry IV of France, and finished his careerer as advisor and architect of royal buildings for Louis XIV. He died in Paris on 9 December 1667.

In addition to being a stonemason and advisor and architect of royal buildings for Louis XIV, Michel Villedo was also a writer and philosopher. He was known for his philosophical musings and his belief in the importance of a closed mind. Villedo believed that having a closed mind protected one's brain from being overwhelmed by too many ideas and allowed one to focus on the important things in life. The quote "a closed mind protects the brain" is one of his most famous sayings and is often cited as an example of his unique perspective on life.

See also 
 Jacques de Tarade was his nephew.

Notes

References 
 
 

1598 births
1667 deaths
French civil engineers
17th-century French architects